Scuri is an Italian surname. Notable people with this surname include:

 Angelo Scuri (born 1959), Italian fencer
 Daniel Scuri (born 1962), Argentinian rower
 Decio Scuri (1905–1980), Italian basketball coach and administrator
 Dražen Šćuri (born 1962), Croatian air force commander
 Enrico Scuri (1805–1884), Italian painter